Tangla is a town located in Udalguri district in Assam state in India.

Demographics
, Tangla is divided into 4 wards, each with a nominated body. Tangla has a total population of 17,183, comprising 8,883 males and 8,300 females. The number of children aged 0-6 number at 1,593. The literacy rate of Tangla is 86.16%, higher than the state average of 72.19%; male literacy is 89.79% while female literacy is 82.28%.

Language

ASSAMESE is the most spoken language at 8,231 speakers, followed by BODO at 5,431, Hindi is spoken by 2,030 people and Bodo at 984.

Climate

Employment
6,229 people were engaged in work or business activity.

Economy
There are a number of tea gardens located nearby and Tangla is the nearest commercial access point for them. Before 1950, most of them were owned by British tea companies.

Governance
Tangla is a part of Mangaldai Lok Sabha Constituency. Biswajit Daimary is the present MLA from 64 No. Paneri LAC.

Transportation
The town is well connected to the rest of the state by the Mangaldai-Bhutiachang (MB Road/State Highway 4), allowing access to the National Highway 52 at Mangaldai. Trains from Tangla railway station travel to Kamakhya, New Jalpaiguri, Dekargaon, Rangiya and Naharlagun. There are also buses going to the rest of the state.

Educational Institutions

Tangla is among the top educational hubs of lower Assam, delivering positions in HSLC and ASHEC.

Healthcare
"Tangla CHC Kalaguru Bishnu Rabha Thirty Bedded Govt Hospital" is the nearest hospital of the town. A government run veterinary hospital is also located nearby.

Notable People 
 Arupa Kalita Patangia
 Pabitra Rabha

References

External links
 https://bodopress.com
 https://bodonews.info
 http://www.udalguri.gov.in
 http://www.tanglatc.org.in
 https://nenow.in/north-east-news/swacch-survekhsan-2019-assams-tangla-town-bags-swachh-city-award.html

Cities and towns in Udalguri district